Vusie Thomas Dlamini (born 23 July 1958) is a Swazi long-distance runner. He competed in the men's marathon at the 1988 Summer Olympics.

References

External links
 

1958 births
Living people
Athletes (track and field) at the 1984 Summer Olympics
Athletes (track and field) at the 1988 Summer Olympics
Swazi male long-distance runners
Swazi male marathon runners
Olympic athletes of Eswatini
Place of birth missing (living people)